Rupandehi 4 one of three parliamentary constituencies of Rupandehi District in Nepal. This constituency came into existence on the Constituency Delimitation Commission (CDC) report submitted on 31 August 2022.

Incorporated areas 
Rupandehi 4 incorporates Sammarimai Rural Municipality, Marchawari Rural Municipality, Kothimai Rural Municipality, wards 2–6 of Mayadevi Rural Municipality, wards 4 and 5 of Siyari Rural Municipality and wards 2, 12 and 13 of Lumbini Sanskritik Municipality.

Assembly segments 
It encompasses the following Lumbini Provincial Assembly segment

 Rupandehi 4(A)
 Rupandehi 4(B)

Members of Parliament

Parliament/Constituent Assembly

Provincial Assembly

4(A)

4(B)

Election results

Election in the 2020s

2022 general election

Election in the 2010s

2017 legislative elections

2017 Nepalese provincial elections

4(A)

4(B)

2013 Constituent Assembly election

Election in the 2000s

2008 Constituent Assembly election

Election in the 1990s

1999 legislative elections

1994 legislative elections

1991 legislative elections

See also 

 List of parliamentary constituencies of Nepal

References

External links 

 Constituency map of Rupandehi

Parliamentary constituencies of Nepal